Robertsbridge Abbey was a Cistercian abbey in Robertsbridge, East Sussex, England. It was founded in 1176 by Alured and Alicia de St Martin.

Due to its position, the Abbey lands suffered continually from the effects of the sea and it was never rich or prominent. The abbey was eventually forcibly surrendered in 1538 by the abbot Thomas Taylor, and dissolved as part of the Dissolution of the Monasteries. There were then eight monks. The property afterwards passed to Sir William Sydney.

The main surviving part of the Abbey is the Abbot's house, built circa 1250, formerly a farmhouse but now part of a private residence. The building is mainly of stone rubble with some red brick and brick buttresses at the back, weather-boarded at the gable end with a steeply-pitched tiled roof. Beneath the building is a crypt. The house is a grade I listed building.

In the garden of the house are the ruins of a rectangular building of stone rubble which was part of the Frater which are separately grade II* listed.

See also
List of monastic houses in East Sussex

References

External links
 'Houses of Cistercian monks: Abbey of Robertsbridge', A History of the County of Sussex: Volume 2 (1973), pp. 71-74. URL: http://www.british-history.ac.uk/report.aspx?compid=36589 Date accessed: 19 June 2011

Cistercian monasteries in England
Buildings and structures in East Sussex
Monasteries in East Sussex
Ruins in East Sussex
Christian monasteries established in the 12th century
1176 establishments in England
1538 disestablishments in England
Grade I listed buildings in East Sussex
Grade II* listed buildings in East Sussex